Wistaston is a civil parish and village in the unitary authority of Cheshire East and the ceremonial county of Cheshire, in North West England. It has a population of 8,222, reducing to 8,117 at the 2011 Census.

History
In the Domesday Survey of 1086, the area was called Wistanestune and was a going concern having a population of 25 to 30 people, valuable woodland and arable land, and deer roaming about. It had been worth 30 shillings, but after William the Conqueror's devastation of Cheshire, it was worth just ten shillings in 1086. It was one of several local villages with the suffix ‘tune’ or ‘ton’ - meaning a ‘farmstead’.

Awards
The village has won the following awards, Cheshire Community Council ‘Best Kept Village Competition’ (1984, 1988, 1998, 1999, 2000), Civic Pride Award (1993, 1994, 1995) and Cheshire Community Council ‘Community Pride’ (2005).

Parish council
The Wistaston Parish Council comprises 15 elected councillors, five from each of the three wards of Wistaston (Wistaston Green, St Mary's, and Wells Green). The current Chairman of the Parish Council is Councillor John Moore. The annual Parish Council meeting, to which all local Wistonians are invited, is held in April each year in the Wistaston Memorial Hall.

Local schools

There are three primary schools in the civil parish, Berkeley (now called The Berkeley Academy), Wistaston Church Lane (now called Wistaston Church Lane Academy) and Wistaston Green (now called Wistaston Academy).

Events 
Events held in the village each year include:
 Village Fete (includes crowning of the Rose Queen, as well as Wistonian of the Year) - formerly held every year at St Mary's Church Rectory in mid-June. Since the Rectory grounds were sold to housing developers the Fete has been held at Wistaston Church Lane Academy School
 Flower and Vegetable Show - held every year at St Mary's Church Hall in August.

Sport 
There are a variety of sports teams in Wistaston, including: archery, badminton, cricket, football, tennis and bowls. 
Wistaston Sports and Leisure Association run the Eric Swan Sports Ground and Brittles Pavilion; the ground is located off Church Lane behind the primary school. The association was set up in 1997; it is an independent 'not for profit' organisation set up to encourage sport and leisure activities in Wistaston.

Further reading
The village magazine, Roundabout, is circulated to over 4,000 homes within Wistaston four times a year.  It is distributed ‘round about’ Wistaston, hence its title. The 100th issue of Roundabout was published in spring 2006 - its 25th anniversary. The first editor of Roundabout was Malcolm Bellis; the current editor is Eileen Bamber.

See also

Listed buildings in Wistaston

References

External links

Cheshire East Council
Wistaston Parish Council
Wistaston Neighbourhood Plan
Wistaston Community Council
Wistaston Sports and Leisure Association
Crewe & Nantwich U3A
Oblate Retreat Centre
Wistaston Jubilee Tennis Club
Wistaston Junior School
Wistaston Village Cricket Club
Wistaston Westfield Infant School
Wistaston (Facebook group)
Wistaston Community News and Events (Facebook page)

Villages in Cheshire
Civil parishes in Cheshire